Diguetia signata is a species of desertshrub spider in the family Diguetidae. It is found in the United States and Mexico.

References

Diguetidae
Articles created by Qbugbot
Spiders described in 1958